Óscar Mauricio Opazo Lara (born 18 October 1990) is a Chilean footballer who currently plays for Racing Club in the Argentine Primera División as a defender.

Club career
In December 2022, he joined Argentine Primera División side Racing Club for the 2023 season.

International career
Opazo got his first call up to the senior Chile side for 2018 FIFA World Cup qualifiers against Ecuador and Peru in October 2016.

International goals
Scores and results list Chile's goal tally first.

Personal life
Opazo is nicknamed Torta (Cake).

Honours

Club
Colo-Colo
Primera División (1): Transición 2017
Supercopa de Chile (2): 2017, 2018

International
Chile
China Cup: 2017

References

External links
 
 

1990 births
Living people
People from Concón
Chilean footballers
Chilean expatriate footballers
Chile international footballers
2019 Copa América players
Santiago Wanderers footballers
Colo-Colo footballers
Racing Club de Avellaneda footballers
Chilean Primera División players
Primera B de Chile players
Argentine Primera División players
Chilean expatriate sportspeople in Argentina
Expatriate footballers in Argentina
Association football defenders